The Constitution of the Netherlands Antilles was proclaimed on 29 March 1955 by Order-in-Council for the Kingdom. Its proclamation was specifically mandated by article 59(4) of the Charter for the Kingdom of the Netherlands, which had been enacted on 15 December 1954. Together with the Island Regulation of the Netherlands Antilles ( or ), the Constitution describes the foundation of the government of the Netherlands Antilles.

The region is still part of the Kingdom of the Netherlands and hence has no autonomy over issues including defence, foreign policy, citizenship and extradition. However, like European Netherlands and Aruba it is autonomous over internal affairs and the three are constitutionally equal.

The region has a federal government under which state governments operate, as described by the constitution. It sets out for a federal government of three parts: Governor of the Netherlands Antilles, representing the Monarch of the Netherlands; a Council of Ministers; and a four-year elected 22-member parliament.

The Netherlands Antilles consists of five islands: Bonaire, Curaçao, Saba, St. Eustatius and St. Maarten. After referendums were held on all these islands, they are currently in the process to change their constitutional status. The dissolution of the Netherlands Antilles will be effective on October 10, 2010. On that date, Bonaire, Saba and St. Eustatius will continue as so called 'gemeentes', which means that they will become part of the country of the Netherlands. At the same time, Curaçao and St. Maarten will each obtain a separate status as a country in the Kingdom of the Netherlands, as is currently enjoyed by Aruba, which left the Netherlands Antilles in 1986.

References 

Government of the Netherlands Antilles
1954 in law
Netherlands Antilles